Halyna Leonidovna Luhova (born April 10, 1976) is a Ukrainian politician serving as the head of the Kherson City Military Administration since 2021.

Life 
She studied foreign languages at the Kherson State University.

Luhova became a politician in 2015. During the 2020 Ukrainian local elections, she was elected to the city council as a member of the party, "." In 2020, she was appointed as secretary of the city council. On September 21, 2022, following the abduction of city mayor Ihor Kolykhaiev, Luhova was appointed by president Volodymyr Zelenskyy as head of the Kherson City Military Administration. Luhova performs the functions of mayor. , she is the only female mayor of a major city in Ukraine. Due to her position, Luhova has become a target during the Russian occupation of Kherson Oblast.

Luhova has two sons.

References 

Living people
1976 births
Politicians from Kherson
21st-century Ukrainian women politicians
Kherson State University alumni